Mazdoor (English: Worker) is a 1983 Hindi film. Produced by B. R. Chopra it is directed by his son Ravi Chopra. The film stars Dilip Kumar, Nanda, Raj Babbar, Suresh Oberoi,  Rati Agnihotri, Padmini Kolhapure, Iftekhar, Madan Puri and Johnny Walker. The music of the film is by R. D. Burman. This was veteran actress Nanda's final appearance before her retirement from acting.

Plot 
The son of Mr. Sinha (Suresh Oberoi) changes everything in order to maximize profits. This brings him into conflict with his employees including Dinanath Saxena. When Dinanath openly confronts Hiralal in a public meeting, Hiralal wants him to tender a written apology, but Dinanath instead resigns and decides to open his very own mill with the help of a struggling Engineer, Ashok Mathur. They do eventually succeed, go into production, hire employees, and soon earn a good reputation. Dinanath gets his daughter, Meena, married to Ashok, who becomes a ghar jamai, much to the chagrin of Smita, the daughter of multi-millionaire Kundanlal Batra, who had expected Ashok to marry her. She soon concocts a scheme to bring discord in the Mathur family, and also ensure Ashok's ruin.

Cast 
Dilip Kumar as Dinanath Saxena
Nanda as Radha Saxena
Raj Babbar as Ashok Mathur
Padmini Kolhapure as Meena Saxena
Rati Agnihotri as Smita Batra
Raj Kiran as Ramesh Saxena
Suresh Oberoi as Heeralal Sinha
Madan Puri as Daulatram
Johnny Walker as Govinda
Iftekhar as Kundanlal Batra
Nazir Hussain as Mr. Sinha
Jagdish Raj as Bank Manager Tiwari

Soundtrack

The songs are composed by R.D. Burman. The lyrics are written by Hasan Kamal. The album consists of seven songs.

Trivia
 Raakhee Gulzar was to play Nanda's role. 
 This was one of Nazir Hussain's last film.
 In the 1980s an English serial, Master Of The Game had nearly same story as Mazdoor.
 After Nikaah, Salma Agha was also to be in Mazdoor and even recorded one song but didn't do the film and she was also acting in Amit Khanna's Sheeshe Ke Ghar opposite Raj Babbar she even recorded all the songs, like Mazdoor she also didn't do this film then Padmini Kolhapure replaced her.
 Rati Agnihothri was uncomfortable with her role and asked Ravi Chopra if she could leave the film. He assured her she would perform well and to just leave it up to him to make sure she performed well.

References

External links 
 

1983 films
1980s Hindi-language films
Films scored by R. D. Burman
Films directed by Ravi Chopra
Films about the working class
Films about labour